Tonezza del Cimone (Cimbrian: Tonetsch) is a town in the province of Vicenza, Veneto, Italy. It is west of SP350 provincial road, in the Venetian Prealps, near the Monte Cimone di Tonezza.

References

Cities and towns in Veneto